Frederick Dalziel Vreeland (born June 24, 1927) is an American career diplomat and writer whose final appointment was as United States Ambassador to Morocco.

Early life
The son of fashion editor Diana Vreeland (1903–1989) and the banker Thomas Reed Vreeland (1899–1966), Vreeland served in the United States Navy Reserve from 1945 to 1947, then was educated at Yale.

Career
In 1951 Vreeland became an Operations Officer with the Central Intelligence Agency and served until 1985. During that time, his foreign service diplomatic assignments were: Economic Officer, US Mission to the UN European Office (1952–1957); Economic Officer, US Mission to West Berlin (1957–1960); Political Officer, US Embassy Bonn, West Germany (1960–1963); Member, National Security Council, at the White House (1963);  Economic Officer, US Embassy Rabat, Morocco (1963–1967); Political Officer, United States Mission to the United Nations (1967–1971); Political Officer, Embassy of the United States, Paris (1971–1978); 
Political Officer, Embassy of the United States, Rome (1978–1985).
In the Summer of 1963 he served temporarily as a member of the National Security Agency in Washington, DC., in order to brief President John F. Kennedy in preparation for the latter's visit to Berlin in June 1963. At Kennedy's request, during one of the last of these briefings, he invented the phrase "Ich bin ein Berliner" and carefully taught the president how to pronounce those German words. This is confirmed by the Kennedy Memorial Library.

Vreeland was Vice President of John Cabot University from 1989 to 1991. In 1990, he was nominated by President George H. W. Bush as United States Ambassador to Burma, but his nomination was not acted upon by the United States Senate and he instead served as ambassador to Morocco, taking up the appointment in 1991.

In 2005, while living in retirement in Rome, Vreeland urged senators not to confirm John Bolton as US  ambassador to the United Nations, saying he had no diplomatic bone in his body and was unworthy of their trust.

References

External links
 https://web.archive.org/web/20021117075817/http://www.state.gov/r/pa/ho/po/com/10404.htm
 https://web.archive.org/web/20100917133235/http://americanambassadors.org/index.cfm?fuseaction=Members.view&memberid=233

1927 births
Living people
Ambassadors of the United States to Morocco
People from Danbury, Connecticut
American expatriates in Italy
American expatriates in Germany
Yale University alumni
American expatriates in France
Writers from Connecticut
Academic staff of John Cabot University
American academic administrators
United States Foreign Service personnel
Vreeland family
United States Navy personnel of World War II
United States Navy reservists